The 1971 Australian Open, also known under its sponsored name Dunlop Australian Open, was a tennis tournament played on outdoor grass courts at the White City Stadium in Sydney, New South Wales, Australia from 7 to 14 March. The tournament was originally scheduled to be played in Melbourne but was moved to Sydney on account of a $125,000 sponsorship deal with Dunlop. The tournament date was moved from its regular January slot to March to accommodate scheduling requirements made by the commercial promoters World Championship Tennis and National Tennis League. It was the 59th edition of the Australian Open, the 17th and final one held in Sydney, and the first Grand Slam tournament of the year. The tournament was part of the 1971 World Championship Tennis circuit. The singles titles were won by Australians Ken Rosewall and Margaret Court. The tiebreak was introduced for all sets except the deciding set.

The competition for mixed doubles was not held between 1970 and 1986 edition.

Seniors

Men's singles

 Ken Rosewall defeated  Arthur Ashe 6–1, 7–5, 6–3

Women's singles

 Margaret Court defeated  Evonne Goolagong 2–6, 7–6, 7–5

Men's doubles

 John Newcombe /  Tony Roche defeated  Tom Okker /  Marty Riessen 6–2, 7–6

Women's doubles

 Evonne Goolagong /  Margaret Court defeated  Jill Emmerson /  Lesley Hunt 6–0, 6–0

External links
 Australian Open official website

References

 
 

 
1971 in Australian tennis
March 1971 sports events in Australia
1971,Australian Open